The Remington Model 7400 is a series of semi-automatic rifles manufactured by Remington Arms. The Model 7400 was a replacement of the Model 740 rifle which Remington produced from 1952 to 1981. The 7400 model was ultimately replaced by the Model 750 in 2006.

History
The Model 7400 was introduced in 1981 and was basically the same as the Model Four. Major differences included a checkered pistol-grip and straight comb stock. Initially only offered with a  barrel, in 1988 an  version was introduced.

Variants

Model 7400 Carbine
Manufactured from 1988 to 2004, the carbine version featured a shortened  barrel.
Model 7400 Special Purpose
Introduced in 1993, the special purpose model featured a non-reflective finish and sling swivels. The SP model was discontinued a year later in December of 1994.
Model 7400 Synthetic
Introduced in 1998, the synthetic model features a fiberglass reinforced stock and a non-reflective finish. It is available in both the standard and carbine length.

References

External links
 Manual

7.62 mm rifles
Semi-automatic rifles of the United States
Remington Arms firearms